The 19th Battalion (Central Ontario), CEF was an infantry battalion of the First World War Canadian Expeditionary Force.

History
The battalion was originally raised at Exhibition Park in Toronto, Ontario, Canada on 6 November 1914.

As part of the 4th Canadian Brigade, 2nd Canadian Division, the 19th went from its station in Toronto to West Sandling Camp, Shorncliffe, England, 23 May 1915 and then to France on 14 September 1915 where it served from 1915 to 1919.

1916 World War Service

Battle of Thiepval

The 19th moved out at 6:45 p.m. on 25 September 1916, following the 20th, 18th, and 21st Canadian battalions on the Albert-Bapaume road toward Courcelette. They were instructed to be at the ready for any movement as they staged themselves at the road with G.F. Morrison commanding. On the 26th, the 19th was instructed to move to Sausage Valley and be ready, and they arrived on the 27th. On the 28th, the 19th was instructed to push forward towards Le Sars where the enemy line was. On the 29th, heavy artillery fire rained down on their position, resulting in heavy casualties. Reports came in that the British had taken the Destremont farm southwest of Le Sars while snipers fired on their position. With a fair amount of shelling coming from Pys, orders came from Rennie to push forward. In his diary of the action at Thiepval, Private John Mould of the 19th expressed the intensity of the advance:

On 15 October 1916, Major General R.E.W. Turner, V.C., K.C.B., K.C.M.G., D.S.O., commander of the 2nd Canadian Division, decorated the men who were honoured for their recent service in battle.

Battle of Le Transloy

The 19th, without its D-Company, who had joined the 20th Battalion, joined with the 18th and 20th Canadian Infantry Battalions, the 4th and 5th Canadian Infantry Brigades, and the 23rd British Division on 1 October 1916 in a concentrated attack of the German lines near Le Transloy. On 3 October, D-Company rejoined the 19th, and were relieved by the 21st Canadian Infantry Battalion. Total losses were 13 killed, 87 wounded, 29 sick, and 3 missing.

Battle of the Ancre Heights

1917 World War Service
 Vimy Ridge
 Hill 70
 Passchendaele

1918 World War Service
 First Battle of the Somme (1918)
 Battle of Amiens
 Second Battle of the Somme (1918)
 Drocourt-Quéant
 Battle of the Hindenburg Line
 Battle of the Canal du Nord
 Pursuit to Mons

Perpetuation 
The 19th Battalion (Central Ontario), CEF is perpetuated by The Argyll and Sutherland Highlanders of Canada (Princess Louise's).

See also 

 List of infantry battalions in the Canadian Expeditionary Force

References

019
Military units and formations established in 1914
Military units and formations disestablished in 1919
1914 establishments in Ontario
Argyll and Sutherland Highlanders of Canada (Princess Louise's)